Jozef Vukušič (born 31 August 1964) is a former football player from Slovakia who currently manages FC Košice

Career

Managerial
Previously Vukušič managed FC Nitra, FC Cape Town and Polokwane City F.C. from South Africa.

On 8 January 2016, Vukušič was appointed as manager of Kazakhstan Premier League side FC Shakhter Karagandy, resigning from the position on 3 August 2016.

References

External links
 FC Cape Town profile

1964 births
Living people
Slovak footballers
Sportspeople from Košice
FC VSS Košice players
Slovak Super Liga managers
Slovak football managers
MFK Ružomberok managers
FC Spartak Trnava managers
Expatriate soccer managers in South Africa
FC Nitra managers
Association footballers not categorized by position
Polokwane City F.C. managers
AmaZulu F.C. managers
Slovak expatriate football managers
Slovak people of Serbian descent